The Hattiesburg School District was a public school district based in Hattiesburg, Mississippi, United States. Most of the district is located in Forrest County, but a small portion extends into Lamar County.

Schools

High schools
Hattiesburg High School (Grades 9-12)

Dr. Hubbard, Principal

Dr. Lashonda Short, Assistant Principal

James Grubbs, Assistant Principal

Marlon Andrews, Assistant Principal

Treenecia Garraway, Lead Counselor (P-Z)

Alysha Johnson,  Counselor (A-G)

Joanne Allen,  Counselor (H-O)

C. Jermaine Brown, Career & Technical Education Director

Charish Pierce, Counselor (Career and Technical Education)

Alternative schools
Mary Bethune Attendance Center (Grades 7-11)
Dexter Jordan, Principal

Middle schools
N. R. Burger Middle School (Grades 7 & 8)
Carol Jones, Principal

Christopher Mark, Assistant Principal

John E. Barnes, Jr., Assistant Principal

Elementary schools
Lillie Burney STEAM ACADEMY  (Grades 6)
Grace Christian Elementary School (Grades K-5)
George H. Hawkins Elementary School (Grades K-5)
Rowan Elementary School (Grades K-5)
W.I. Thames Elementary School (Grades K-5)
F.B. Woodley Elementary School (Grades K-5)

Demographics

2006-07 school year
There were a total of 4,469 students enrolled in the Hattiesburg Public School District during the 2006–2007 school year. The gender makeup of the district was 50% female and 50% male. The racial makeup of the district was 91.30% African American, 6.40% White, 1.70% Hispanic, 0.56% Asian, and 0.04% Native American. 78.5% of the district's students were eligible to receive free lunch.

Previous school years

Accountability statistics

See also
List of school districts in Mississippi

References

External links

 
 Hattiesburg Public School District (Archive)

Education in Forrest County, Mississippi
Education in Lamar County, Mississippi
Hattiesburg, Mississippi
School districts in Mississippi